Estadio Tetelo Vargas is a multi-use stadium in San Pedro de Macorís, Dominican Republic.  It is currently used mostly for baseball matches and hosts the home games of Estrellas Orientales. The stadium was built in 1959 and seats 8,000 people.

Estrellas Orientales temporarily played in the Estadio Francisco Micheli during the 1979–80 season after the stadium sustained damage from hurricane David.

References

San Pedro de Macorís
Tetelo Vargas
Buildings and structures in San Pedro de Macorís Province
Sports venues completed in 1959